Friedrich Ringshausen (28 June 1880 in Nidda – 17 February 1941 in Darmstadt) was an official of the Nazi Party (NSDAP) who served as the Gauleiter of Gau Hesse-Darmstadt and in the State government of the People's State of Hesse.

Early years
The son of a master glazier, Ringshausen attended school in Nidda, and then teacher training college in Friedberg from 1896 to 1899. Passing his state teacher examinations in 1901, he then entered the Hessian school service. In 1909 he became a teacher in Offenbach am Main. In 1918 he became a member of the Deutschvölkischer Schutz- und Trutzbund, the largest, most active, and most influential antisemitic federation in Germany. From 1919 to 1923 he was a member of the German National People’s Party (DNVP), an alliance of nationalists, reactionary monarchists, völkisch and antisemitic elements.

Nazi career
In September 1923, he joined the Nazi Party and founded an ortsgruppe (Local Group) in Offenbach am Main, serving as the Ortsgruppenleiter.  When the Party was banned in the aftermath of the Beer Hall Putsch, Ringshausen remained active as an orator and advanced to being Kreisleiter (County Leader) in the Offenbach area. After the ban on the Party was lifted, he rejoined the NSDAP (membership number 8,993) on 3 July 1925. When the Party restructured its existing Gaue in the Hesse-Nassau region into three Gaue on 1 March 1927, Ringshausen was appointed the first Gauleiter of the new Gau Hesse-Darmstadt, consisting of the People's State of Hesse, comprising the provinces of Upper Hesse, Rheinhessen and Starkenburg).

On 7 November, 1929 he became a member of the Offenbach Stadtrat (City Council) and also of the Starkenburg Provincial Landtag. In September 1930, he was elected to the Reichstag from electoral constituency 33, (Hesse-Darmstadt) and remained a Reichstag Deputy until his death. Also in that year, Ringshausen joined the National Socialist Teachers League and became its chairman in Hesse, retaining this position until his death.
 
On 9 January 1931, Ringshausen was given a leave of absence from his Gauleiter position, and was succeeded by Peter Gemeinder. Ringshausen was posted to the Party’s Reichsleitung (National Leadership) office at the Brown House in Munich. He became a Reichsredner (National Speaker) and was engaged in propaganda activity. He would not return to his prior post, as Gau Hesse-Darmstadt on 1 January 1933 was merged with the neighboring Gau Hesse-Nassau South to form Gau Hesse-Nassau under Jakob Sprenger. Instead, Ringshausen became Gauinspekteur and head of the Party’s Office of Education in Gau Hesse-Nassau. He would retain these Party assignments until his death.

After the Nazi seizure of power in 1933, Ringshausen was named a Ministerial Advisor in the government of the People’s State of Hesse on 24 June. This was followed on 1 July 1933 by his appointment as Leader of Ministerial Department II in the Hessian State Ministry, where he oversaw education, culture, art and nationhood issues. He would retain this governmental post until his death. In November 1935, he was again named as a Reichsredner on behalf of the Nazi Auslands-Organisation.

A member of the Sturmabteilung (SA), Ringshausen was promoted to SA-Standartenführer on 30 January 1938. He died on 17 February 1941.

Bibliography

References

External website
 

1880 births
1941 deaths
Gauleiters
German National People's Party politicians
Members of the Reichstag of Nazi Germany
Members of the Reichstag of the Weimar Republic
Nazi Party officials
Nazi Party politicians
Nazi propagandists
People from Nidda
Sturmabteilung officers